The Batignolles group (Le groupe des Batignolles) was a group of young avant-garde painters from the end of the 19th century who gathered around Édouard Manet. The group bears its name in reference to the Batignolles district, where the artists used to meet between 1869 and 1875.  Many of the artists in the group later became known for the Impressionism movement.

Background 
Édouard Manet (1832–1883) lived on Boulevard des Batignolles, and maintained his workshop on Rue Guyot (now renamed Rue Médéric). He achieved some success at the Salon in 1861 with The Spanish Singer (1860), which received accolades from writer Charles Baudelaire (1821–1867) and journalist and literary critic Théophile Gautier (1811–1872).  This enhanced reputation also brought younger artists into Manet's sphere out of admiration and respect, making him the leader of a new avant-garde movement centered around Batignolles.

The studio of academic artist Charles Gleyre (1806–1874) attracts many from what will later become the Batignolles group.  Pierre-Auguste Renoir (1841–1919), Alfred Sisley (1839–1899), and Frédéric Bazille  (1841–1870) begin studying at Gleyre in 1862, followed by Claude Monet in 1863.  They all become friends, but Monet leaves the studio after finding it less conducive to his goals as an artist.

Cafe Guerbois 
Around Manet, a group of friends formed to regularly meet in the neighborhood's cafes, in particular at the Café Guerbois (which has now disappeared, but a plaque still marks its location at 11 Avenue de Clichy).

The most frequent attendees at these meetings were Manet himself, Renoir, Sisley and Bazille. From time to time, they were joined by other painters, such as Camille Pissarro and Edgar Degas, the patron and critic Edmond Maître, the writer Émile Zola and the photographer Nadar. Their conversations and discussions contained fruitful exchanges of ideas and theories as to how to overcome the conservative Académie des Beaux-Arts that controlled the annual exhibition at the Salon de Paris.

Franco-Prussian War 

After Napoleon III declared war on Prussia in 1870, many members of the group enlisted as soldiers.  Cézanne avoided the draft by escaping to L'Estaque, a village in southern France, just west of Marseille.  While there, Cézanne began to practice the new techniques he had leaned from the Batignolles group, using small brushstrokes and a brighter palette.

Meanwhile, Monet, Sisley, and Pissarro all left France separately for London, England. According to Pissarro, he met up with Monet by accident in London, and they began to work together and study London landscapes: "Monet worked in the parks, while I studied the effects of fog, snow, and springtime." It was also in London where Monet and Pissarro first met and developed a relationship with French art dealer Paul Durand-Ruel, who would later become instrumental to the success of the Impressionists, beginning with large purchases of their work in 1872.

Degas fought in the National Guard and had little time to paint. Bazille died on the battlefield at Beaune-la-Rolande in November at the age of twenty-eight.

Society of Artists, Painters, Sculptors and Etchers 
This association became official on December 27, 1873, with a charter signed by Monet, Renoir, Sisley, Pissarro, Degas, and Pierre Prins. Monet published on January 27, 1874, in issue 3 La Chronique des Arts the announcement of the foundation of the "Société anonyme des artistes peintres, sculpteurs et graveurs", and planned to exhibit their art independently.

First exhibition 
The first exhibition of the group was held from April 15-May 15, 1874, at Nadar's former workshop at No. 35, Boulevard des Capucines. One featured painting by Monet, Impression, Sunrise, later led to the name of Impressionists. Another of Monet's paintings, entitled Boulevard des Capucines, dates from this time.

The show did not go well, and many people came to laugh and deride the artists and their work.

Second exhibition 
A second exhibition held in 1875 was met with violence by the crowd and the police had to be called.  The paintings that did sell were sold for low prices, and many of the artists were reduced to begging for loans to survive.

Legacy 
Among the artists of the Batignolles, many later became known as great masters of the Impressionist movement.

The group was immortalized in an 1870 painting by Henri Fantin-Latour, now in the Musée d'Orsay.

Members 

Core of nine

 Claude Monet, nucleus
 Pierre-Auguste Renoir, nucleus
 Alfred Sisley, nucleus
 Frédéric Bazille, nucleus
 Camille Pissarro
 Paul Cézanne
 Berthe Morisot, only woman in the core group
 Édouard Manet, intellectual leader
 Edgar Degas

 Minor roles

 Félix Bracquemond
 Armand Guillaumin
 Antoine Guillemet
 Henri Fantin-Latour
 Gustave Caillebotte, patron
 Edmond Maître
 Émile Zola, promoted and defended the group
 Pierre Prins
 Mary Cassatt
 Paul Gauguin
 Nadar, hosted the first exhibition of Impressionists in his studio

References

Further reading 

 House, John (2004). Impressionism: Paint and Politics. Yale University Press. ISBN 0300102402.
 Jean-Jacques Leveque, Les Années impressionniste 1870–1889, Ediz. ACR, Courbevoie, 2000 - ISBN 2-86770-042-6
 Sophie Monneret, L'Impressionnisme et son époque : Noms propres A à T, vol. 2, t. 1, Paris, Robert Laffont, 1987, 997 p. ISBN 978-2-221-05412-3.
 Sophie Monneret, L'Impressionnisme et son époque, vol. 2, t. II, Paris, Robert Laffont, 1987, 1185 p. ISBN 978-2-221-05413-0.

Impressionism
19th-century art groups
French artist groups and collectives
19th-century French painters